

A 
 Ahom Kingdom – The Ahom Kingdom

 – Kingdom of Alodia
 Andorra – Principality of Andorra
 Aragon – Crown of Aragon
 – Duchy of Athens
 Ayutthaya Kingdom
 – Tepanec Empire

B 

 – Viscountcy of Béarn
 Bosnian Kingdom
 Burgundian Netherlands

 Byzantine Empire

C 
 – Barony of Carbery
  Castile – Crown of Castile 
  Catalonia – Principality of Catalonia
 – Rajahnate of Cebu

  – Cherokee Tribe
 – Kingdom of Chimor
 – Chinese Empire
 – Kingdom of Connacht
 
  – Creek Tribe
  – Kingdom of Cusco

E 
 – Kingdom of East Breifne
 England – Kingdom of England
 – Despotate of the Epirus
 – Ethiopian Empire

F 
 – Kingdom of France

G 
  Golden Horde
  Granada – Emirate of Granada

H 
 Holy Roman Empire
 – Kingdom of Hungary

 – Huron Tribe

I 
Iroquois – The Iroquois League

J 
Japan – Ashikaga Shogunate

K 
 Kalmar Union

 – Sultanate of Kashmir, Gabari Tajik dynasty
 (Joseon Dynasty)

L 
 – Lan Xang Hom Khao 
Lithuania – Grand Duchy of Lithuania

M 

 – Sultanate of Malwa
 Mamluk Sultanate (Cairo)
 – Mayapan, Cocom dynasty
 
 – Moghulistan, or the Eastern Chagatai Khanate

 Moldavia – Principality of Moldavia

 – Despotate of Morea
 – Sultanate of Morocco
 – Kingdom of Mutapa
 Mysore – Kingdom of Mysore

N 

 Naples – Kingdom of Naples
  Navarre – Kingdom of Navarre

O 
 Osraige

 Ottoman Empire – Sublime Ottoman State

P 
 Papal States
 Poland – Kingdom of Poland
 Portugal – Kingdom of Portugal

Q 

  – Kingdom of Quito

R 
Ryukyu
Hokuzan
Chūzan
Nanzan

S 
 County of Santa Fiora
 Scotland – Kingdom of Scotland
 Serbia – Serbian Despotate
 – Tribe of Shawnee
 – Kingdom of Sukhothai
 Sultanate of Sulu

T 
 Tartu – Bishopric of Tartu
 Texcoco
 Thomond – Kingdom of Thomond
 Timurid Empire – Timurid dynasty
 Tlatelolco
 Tlaxcala – Tlaxcallan Confederacy
 – Kingdom of Tondo
 – Empire of Trebizond

V

W 
 Wallachia
 West Breifne – Kingdom of West Breifne

Z 
 – Zapotec tribe
  Zeta – Principality of Zeta

1400